Francisco Gómez de Mendiola y Solórzano (January 19, 1519 – April 23, 1576) was a Roman Catholic prelate who served as Bishop of Guadalajara (1574-1576).

Biography
Francisco Gómez de Mendiola y Solórzano was born in Durango, Spain. On April 19, 1574, he was appointed by the King of Spain and confirmed by Pope Gregory XIII as Bishop of Guadalajara. On December 12, 1574, he was consecrated bishop by Pedro Moya de Contreras, Archbishop of Mexico. He served as Bishop of Guadalajara until his death on April 23, 1576.

References

External links and additional sources
 (for Chronology of Bishops)
 (for Chronology of Bishops)

1519 births
1576 deaths
Bishops appointed by Pope Gregory XIII
16th-century Roman Catholic bishops in Mexico